Gregory Wilson may refer to:

 Greg Wilson (gridiron football) (born 1990), American football wide receiver
 Greg Wilson (DJ) (born 1960), British DJ
 Greg Wilson (soccer) (born c. 1971/1972), American soccer head coach and former player
 Gregory Wilson (Australian cricketer) (born 1958), Australian cricket player
 Greg Wilson (Saint Lucian cricketer) (born 1972), Saint Lucian cricketer
 Gregory Wilson (magician), American magician
 The Greg Wilson, American comedian and actor
 Greg Wilson (bowls) (born 1982), Canadian lawn bowls player
 Greg Wilson (curler) (born 1966), American curler